The foreign relations of Jordan have been consistently a pro-Western foreign policy. Jordan had close relations with the United States and the United Kingdom. These relations were damaged when Jordan proclaimed its neutrality during the Gulf War and maintained relations with Iraq. In public, Jordan continued to call for the lifting of UN sanctions against Iraq within the context of implementing UNIC resolutions .

Since the end of the war, Jordan has largely restored its relations with Western countries through its participation in the Middle East war process and enforcement of UN sanctions against Iraq.

Jordan signed a non-aggression pact with Israel (the Washington Declaration) in Washington, D.C., on July 25, 1994. Jordan and Israel signed a historic peace treaty on October 26, 1994, witnessed by President Clinton, accompanied by Secretary of State Warren Christopher. The U.S. has participated with Jordan and Israel in trilateral development discussions during which key issues have been water-sharing and security; cooperation on Jordan Rift Valley development; infrastructure projects; and trade, finance, and banking issues.

In 2013, the United States approved the CIA–led Timber Sycamore covert operation, based in Jordan, to train and arm Syrian rebels.

Jordan also participates in the multilateral war talks, and recently Jordan has signed a free trade agreement  with the United States. Jordan is an active member of the UN and several of its specialized and related agencies, including the Food and Agriculture Organization (FAO), International Atomic Energy Agency (IAEA), and World Health Organization (WHO). Jordan is a member of the World Bank, International Monetary Fund (IMF), Organisation of Islamic Cooperation (OIC), Non-Aligned Movement, and Arab League.

Within the context of the European Union's European Neighbourhood Policy, the EU and Jordan have jointly adopted an Action plan to reinforce their political and economic interdependence, and further implement their current Association Agreement. This Action Plan  covers a timeframe of three to five years and will encourage and support Jordan's national reform objectives and further integration into European economic and social structures.

Israel captured Jerusalem in 1967, which is located at the West Bank of Jordan. Since 1967 Pakistan has been demanding its vacation at the international level. Jordan together with Pakistan is playing an effective role in the Organisation of Islamic Cooperation (OIC).

Bilateral relations

See also
 List of diplomatic missions in Jordan
 List of diplomatic missions of Jordan
 Visa requirements for Jordanian citizens

References

External links
 The Washington Declaration between Jordan and Israel
 EU Neighbourhood Info Centre: Country profile of Jordan